Hypselobarbus jerdoni, also known as Jerdon's carp, is a species of cyprinid fish endemic to India where it is found in larger streams of southern Karnataka, Tamil Nadu, Kerala and Maharashtra. This species can grow to a length of  TL. It is caught commercially for human consumption.

References

jerdoni
Freshwater fish of India
Endemic fauna of India
Fish described in 1870
Taxa named by Francis Day